Lehua M. Taitano (born August 4, 1978) is a Chamoru poet, interdisciplinary artist, and educator. She is an indigenous person of the Mariana Islands, which are referred to as Laguås yan Gani in the Chamoru language.

Early life and education
Taitano was born in Hagåtña, Guåhan Guam. She is an indigenous Chamoru (also spelled CHamoru and Chamorro) from the village of Yigu, and her family migrated to a small, rural town in the Appalachian Mountains of North Carolina when she was very young.  She attended Appalachian State University as a North Carolina Teaching Fellow. She played on the women's varsity volleyball team and earned a bachelor's degree in English, with a focus on education. Taitano studied and taught martial arts classes (Shaolin Kung Fu and Tai Chi) before earning an MFA in fiction from the University of Montana.

Career
Her work has appeared in World Literature Today, the Academy of American Poets series Poem a Day, Arc Poetry Magazine, Poetry (magazine), Fence, Tayo, Red Ink, Kartika Review, Hawai'i Review, Narrative Witness, Lit Hub, Witness, The Offending Adam, Platte Valley Review, Versal, dislocate, TinFish Journal, Nano Fiction, Storyboard, and A Transpacific Poetics.

Several of her poems have been translated into Swedish by the journal Kritiker.

Taitano has published two books of poetry: A Bell Made of Stones and Inside Me an Island and three chapbooks: appalachiapacific (winner of the H.G. Merriam Frontier Award), Sonoma, and Capacity, which is a digital chapbook of poetry and visual art.

Of A Bell Made of Stones, critics note that Taitano's poetry is among "a new wave of Chamorro and Pacific literature" that forces readers "to engage with the unsettling disconnection and stress of locating a coherent voice and a culturally legible identity/identities in the fragments of loss and daily misrecognitions created by distance, diaspora and resistance to performing so-called hetero-normativity,"

In a review of Inside Me an Island, Taitano's second full-length book, reviewer Julie Szews of Transmotion Literary Journal notes:
“Translating the ever-flowing movement of the sea, Taitano expresses herself through the versatility of her poetry. In 17 poems Ma’te (Low Tide) explores memories of the sea and her siblings (Shore Song, Create a sibling…), visitations of ancestral spirits (A Night Crowded With Night), erasure and reconnection (Islanders waiting for Snow), patriotism and militarism (Spectator), encounters with racism (Banana Queen) and the feeling of displacement (Trespass). Likewise, Hafnot (High Tide) explores nature and landscape of the mainland United States (Enchanted Rock, Texas) as well as the indigenous stories that are connected to the land (One Kind of Hunger). Taitano’s poems also explore emotional memories of grief (An Oiled Groove) and love (Estuary). With its queer female diasporic Chamoru voice, Lehua Taitano’s latest poetry collection enriches the multiplicity of unique styles and voices of Chamorro poetry.”

In 2019, Taitano co-founded the art collective Art 25: Art in the Twenty-fifth Century with artist Lisa Jarrett. She was interviewed about her poetry and Art 25 by the radio shows It's Lit!. and OutSources. Art 25's debut exhibit, Future Ancestors, features photography and installation in collaboration with special effects artist and poet Jocelyn Kapumealani Ng.

Since 2017, she served as the Community Outreach Director for the Thinking Its Presence: Race and Creative Writing Conference. Her interdisciplinary art installations and somatic poetry performances have been exhibited by the Smithsonian Institution and several galleries and universities.

Personal life
Taitano currently lives in Sonoma County, California, where she also works as a United Bicycle Institute-certified bicycle mechanic.

Selection works

Poetry

Fiction

In Anthology

Installation art and performance
An Aberrational Poetics: Inside Me an Island Shaped W/hole, 'Ae Kai Culture Lab on Convergence, Smithsonian Asian Pacific American Center
The Unburden Project, Urban x Indigenous, SOMArts
Current, I, A Day in the Queer Life of Asian Pacific America, Smithsonian APAC
Future Ancestors, Art 25: Art in the Twenty-fifth Century, Orí Gallery

Awards and honors 
 2019 - Eliza So Fellowship
 2019 - University of Arizona Poetry Center Residency recipient
 2010 - Merriam Frontier Award Winner

References

1978 births
Living people
American women poets
Chamorro people
American LGBT poets
Guamanian writers
21st-century American women writers
21st-century American poets